Hathara Denama Soorayo may refer to:
 Hathara Denama Soorayo (1971 film), a Sri Lankan Sinhala action romantic film
 Hathara Denama Soorayo (2008 film), a Sri Lankan Sinhala action romantic film, a remake of the above